Stéphan Tremblay (born November 4, 1973) is a former politician in Quebec, Canada. Tremblay was a member of the House of Commons of Canada from 1996 to 2002, and a member of the National Assembly of Quebec from 2002 to 2006. He was born in Alma, Quebec.

Member of Parliament

He won a by-election in 1996 and succeeded Lucien Bouchard as Member of Parliament for the Lac-Saint-Jean electoral district.  Tremblay was affiliated with the Bloc Québécois.  He was re-elected in the 1997 and 2000 elections.

Provincial politics

In 2002, he left federal politics and won a provincial by-election on June 17, 2002 as a Parti Québécois candidate.  He represented the riding of Lac Saint-Jean in the Saguenay-Lac-Saint-Jean region.  Tremblay was re-elected to the MNA in the 2003 election.  He served as the opposition critic for environment until his resignation in 2006.

In 1998, he removed his green upholstered chair from the Canadian House of Commons and returned with it to his Quebec riding in protest of the gaps between the rich and the poor. He returned the chair a week later.

In August 2004, Tremblay was injured when the small plane he was flying crashed near Alma, Quebec after hitting Hydro-Québec's high-voltage power lines. .

References

External links
 
 

1973 births
Bloc Québécois MPs
Living people
Members of the House of Commons of Canada from Quebec
Parti Québécois MNAs
People from Alma, Quebec
21st-century Canadian politicians